Lamwo is a town in the Northern Region of Uganda and the political and administrative center of Lamwo District.

Location
The approximate coordinates of the town are 03 31 48N, 32 48 00E (Latitude:3.5300; Longitude:32.800).

Points of interest
The following points of interest lie within the town limits or near the edges of town:

 offices of Lamwo Town Council
 Lamwo central market
 Lamwo-Kitgum road

See also
 Acholi sub-region

External links
 Satellite Map of Area Around The Town of Lamwo

References

Lamwo District
Populated places in Northern Region, Uganda
Cities in the Great Rift Valley